Jiribam District (Meitei pronunciation: /jee-ree-baam/) is a district in the state of Manipur, India. It was created in December 2016 from the Imphal East district.

Administrative divisions 
The following are the sub-divisions in Jiribam district:
 Jiribam
 Borobekra

Jiribam district as a whole is one state assembly constituency - the Jiribam Assembly constituency.

Demographics
The district had a population of 42,838. Scheduled Castes and Scheduled Tribes make up 16.94% and 12.52% of the population respectively.

Religion

Hinduism is the majority religion in Jiribam district, followed by Islam.

See also 
 List of populated places in Jiribam district

Notes

References

External links 
 Jiribam district

 
Districts of Manipur